Sobha may refer to:

Places
 Sobha, Algeria, a town and commune in Chlef Province
 Sobha, Nepal, a village development committee
 Sobha Hi-tech city, a proposed township in India

People
 Sobha Brahma (1929–2012), Indian painter and sculptor
 Sobha Singh (builder) (1890–1978), Indian Sikh real estate developer
 Sobha Singh (painter) (1901–1986), Indian Sikh painter

Other uses
 Sobha Ltd., an Indian multinational real estate developer
 Sobha (1958 film), a Telugu drama film

See also
 Shobha (Mahalakshmi Menon, 1962–1980), Indian actress

Indian masculine given names